Oskar Baker (born 25 May 1998) is a professional Australian rules footballer playing for the  in the Australian Football League (AFL).

Early life
Baker was born in Queensland and attended Padua College in Brisbane and played for Aspley in the North East Australian Football League before being drafted by Melbourne with the 48th selection in the 2017 national draft.

AFL career

Statistics
Updated to the end of the 2022 season.

|-
| 2019 ||  || 33
| 9 || 2 || 4 || 79 || 45 || 124 || 40 || 15 || 0.2 || 0.4 || 8.8 || 5.0 || 13.8 || 4.4 || 1.7
|-
| 2020 ||  || 33
| 3 || 2 || 0 || 30 || 11 || 41 || 8 || 5 || 0.7 || 0.0 || 10.0 || 3.7 || 13.7 || 2.7 || 1.7
|-
| 2021 ||  || 33
| 3 || 0 || 0 || 12 || 3 || 15 || 5 || 4 || 0.0 || 0.0 || 4.0 || 1.0 || 5.0 || 1.7 || 1.3
|-
| 2022 ||  || 33
| 0 || – || – || – || – || – || – || – || – || – || – || – || – || – || –
|- class=sortbottom
! colspan=3 | Career
! 15 !! 4 !! 4 !! 121 !! 59 !! 180 !! 53 !! 24 !! 0.3 !! 0.3 !! 8.1 !! 3.9 !! 12.0 !! 3.5 !! 1.6
|}

Notes

References

External links

1998 births
Living people
Aspley Football Club players
Melbourne Football Club players
Western Bulldogs players
Australian rules footballers from Queensland
People educated at Padua College (Brisbane)